is a national highway connecting Port of Tokyo and Route 15 in Tokyo, Japan. It is the second shortest national highway in Japan.

Route data
Length: 0.5km
Origin: Port of Tokyo
Terminus: Minato, Tokyo (ends at Junction with Route 15)

History
1953-05-18 - Second Class National Highway 130 from Port of Tokyo to intersection with Route 15)
1965-04-01 - General National Highway 130 from Port of Tokyo to intersection with Route 15)

References

130
Roads in Tokyo